The Dark Horse Book of... was the banner title given to a series of four Dark Horse Comics one-shot hardcover comic book horror anthologies edited by Scott Allie and featuring the work of Mike Mignola and others. In 2017 Dark Horse collected all four volumes together in The Dark Horse Book of Horror.

Volumes

The Dark Horse Book of Hauntings
This first volume was published on August 27, 2003 and featured Mike Mignola's only new Hellboy story for that year as well as a new Devil's Footprints story, a Victorian ghost story illustrated by Gary Gianni, and an interview with real-life séance medium L.L. Dreller.  

In his introduction editor Scott Allie states that he has loved anthologies for as long as he can remember and that the theme for this anthology came from the Hellboy story about a haunted house contributed by Mike Mignola, although he would later expand the remit somewhat to fit the works of Randy Stradler and others.

Jill Thompson won the 2004 "Best Painter/Multimedia Artist (Interior)" Eisner Award for the story Stray in this collection.

The Dark Horse Book of Witchcraft
This second volume was published July 7, 2004 and featured a new Hellboy story by Mike Mignola as well as a sequel to Stray by Evan Dorkin and Jill Thompson story, a classic witch tale by Clark Ashton Smith illustrated by cover artist Gary Gianni, and an interview with Wiccan High Priestess Phyllis Currott.  

In the introduction, editor Scott Allie states that he was once again influenced by Mike Mignola in the choice of a theme for this second volume, which is inspired by the works of Nathaniel Hawthorne, Lord Dunsany and Weird Tales (for whom Smith formerly wrote).  

The volume was nominated for the 2004 "Favorite One-Shot" Wizard Fan Award and Evan Dorkin and Jill Thompson won the 2005 "Best Short Story" Eisner Award for the story Unfamiliar.

The Dark Horse Book of the Dead
This third volume was published June 1, 2005 and featured a new Hellboy story by Mike Mignola as well as a story by Goon creator Eric Powell and a classic tale by Conan the Barbarian creator Robert E. Howard illustrated by cover artist Gary Gianni.  

In his introduction editor Scott Allie states that this was supposed to be the last book in the series, because he thought he was pushing his luck with three, but he changed his mind and a fourth was produced. He agreed to it because he enjoyed working with the writers and artists involved in the series.

The Dark Horse Book of Monsters
This fourth and final volume was published December 13, 2006 and featured a new Hellboy story by Mike Mignola as well as Kurt Busiek and Keith Giffen's homage to the great monster comics of Jack Kirby and a classic tale of South Seas horror by William Hope Hodgson illustrated by cover artist Gary Gianni.

The volume was nominated for the 2007 "Favourite Foreign Comic Book or Graphic Novel of the Year" Ledger Award and Jill Thompson won the 2007 "Best Painter/Multimedia Artist (Interior)" Eisner Award in part for the story A Dog and His Boy in this collection.

References